Miroslav Kozák (born 30 October 1976) is a Slovak former footballer who is last known to have played as a forward for FK Bodva Moldava nad Bodvou. Besides Slovakia, he has played in the Czech Republic, Iran and Hungary.

Career

In 2000, Kozák signed for Czech side Žižkov. In 2001, he signed for Žilina in the Slovak top flight. In 2002, he was sent on loan to Slovak second tier club DAC. Before the second half of 2003–04, Kozák signed for FC Petržalka in the Slovak top flight, helping them win the 2003–04 Slovak Cup. In 2004, he signed for Iranian second tier team Oghab. 

In 2007, Kozák signed for Tatabánya in the Hungarian top flight, where he made 6 league appearances and scored 0 goals. On 25 August 2007, he debuted for Tatabánya during a 0-7 loss to Fehérvár. In 2008, Kozák signed for Slovak third tier outfit FK Bodva Moldava nad Bodvou.

References

External links

 Miroslav Kozák at iDNES.cz

Slovak footballers
Expatriate footballers in Iran
Slovak expatriate sportspeople in the Czech Republic
Czech First League players
1976 births
Association football forwards
Living people
FK Bodva Moldava nad Bodvou players
FC Petržalka players
MŠK Žilina players
FC DAC 1904 Dunajská Streda players
AS Trenčín players
FK Viktoria Žižkov players
Azadegan League players
ŠK Futura Humenné players
2. Liga (Slovakia) players
Slovak expatriate sportspeople in Hungary
Nemzeti Bajnokság I players
FC Tatabánya players
Slovak Super Liga players
Expatriate footballers in Hungary
Sanat Naft Abadan F.C. players
Expatriate footballers in the Czech Republic
Slovak expatriate footballers
Slovak expatriate sportspeople in Iran